Dzerzhinsky Prospekt is a street in Dzerzhinsky City District of Novosibirsk, Russia. It starts from Seleznyov Street and runs northeast, crosses Koshurnikov, Krasin, Shakespeare, Korolyov, Volochayevskaya and Polzunov streets. The prospekt ends near the bridge over the Kamenka River. The length of the street is about 5.7 kilometers (3.5 mi).

History
Dzerzhinsky Prospekt is one of the oldest roads in Novosibirsk. In the 17th and 18th centuries this road was part of Kalmyk Route which ran from Krivoshchyokovo (current Leninsky District of Novosibirsk) to Tomsk.

In 1948, Dzerzhinsky Prospekt 1 was built.

In 1957, the street was named after Felix Dzerzhinsky.

Architecture

Organizations
 State Regional Center for Standardization, Metrology and Testing
 Dzerzhinsky District Administration

Parks
 Beryozovaya Roshcha Park
 Dzerzhinsky Park

Gallery

Transportation

Metro
Entrance to Beryozovaya Roshcha Station is located between Dzerzhinsky Prospekt and Koshurnikov Street.

Notable residents
 Robert Bartini (1897–1974) was an Italian-born Soviet aircraft designer and scientist. He lived on Dzerzhinsky Prospekt 75 from 1952 to 1956.

References

Dzerzhinsky City District, Novosibirsk
Streets in Novosibirsk